Arawak Cay, also referred to as Fish Fry, is an area of Nassau, Bahamas. It is known for its local eateries on West Bay Street, about 15 minutes from downtown Nassau and 25 minutes from Atlantis Paradise Island resort.

References

Islands of the Bahamas